John Mintoff (born 23 August 1988) is a Maltese international footballer who plays for Gudja United as a midfielder.

Career
Mintoff spent most of his career at Sliema Wanderers, appearing in 229 matches over 15 seasons with the club. He spent time on loan at Mqabba, Floriana and Tarxien Rainbows before moving to Gudja United permanently in 2022.

He made his international debut for Malta in 2012. He has appeared for them in FIFA World Cup qualifying matches.

References

External links
 

1988 births
Living people
Maltese footballers
Malta international footballers
Sliema Wanderers F.C. players
Mqabba F.C. players
Floriana F.C. players
Maltese Premier League players
Association football midfielders